El Molle may refer to:

El Molle culture, an ancient archaeological culture of Chile
, a city in Chile